Gomarun (also Romanized as Gomārūn; also known as Gamarān, Gomārān, and Gumārūn) is a village in Hayat Davud Rural District, in the Central District of Ganaveh County, Bushehr Province, Iran. At the 2006 census, its population was 261, in 60 families.

References 

Populated places in Ganaveh County